Timucin Lam (born Timucin Fabian Kwong Wah Aluo; 25 July 1987), known professionally as Jax Jones, is an English DJ, songwriter, record producer and remixer. He rose to fame in 2014 by featuring on Duke Dumont's number-one single "I Got U". He followed this up with his own singles "You Don't Know Me" featuring Raye and "Instruction" featuring Demi Lovato and Stefflon Don in 2016 and 2017, respectively. Jax's debut studio album, Snacks (Supersize), was released on 6 September 2019. It was preceded by the single "One Touch" featuring Jess Glynne.

Personal life
Jax grew up in a multi-ethnic household and was exposed to a wealth of influences. His father is Turkish and gave him the name Timucin. His mother is Chinese-Malaysian. After his Nigerian stepfather introduced him to afrobeat via Fela Kuti and rap with a tape of a Notorious B.I.G. album, Jax listened to hip hop, R&B, gospel and traditional African music. His Malaysian mother was into music ranging from Kylie Minogue to Luther Vandross and also influenced him. Producers like The Neptunes, Timbaland and Rodney Jerkins shaped his musical horizons and his fascination with the anatomy of a rhythm section. Having initially studied classical guitar from a young age, Jax took up beat-making at 15 after discovering Cubase on his friend's Atari.

On 18 September 2020, Jax announced on his Instagram that his wife had given birth to their daughter, Lawana, and on 19 March 2023, Jax revealed that he had become a father for the second time with the birth of his second daughter Ariyah.

Music career

Early beginnings
Performing at open mic clubs around London, Jax eventually came together with Ripperman, a grime producer from Mitcham, at Brixton's Raw Materials Studio, and worked on releases for Big Narstie and Roadside Gs, among others in the scene. His parents encouraged him to go to university at 18. Opting to stay closer to Raw Materials, he declined an interview at the University of Oxford to attend Brunel University in Uxbridge. Despite a two-hour trip, Jax went from lectures to the studio daily to work on his craft, posting beats regularly on Myspace. After graduation, Jax rented a studio in Sydenham after not being allowed back in the family home, bought a Mac tower from Gumtree and worked daily to hone his craft.

2014: Breakthrough
After meeting Duke Dumont, he developed an interest in house music and together they co-wrote and produced "I Got U", "Won't Look Back" and "Ocean Drive". Jones features on the single "I Got U", the song peaked at number one on the UK Singles Chart in March 2014, leading to his breakthrough as an artist.

2015–2019: Snacks
On 24 July 2015, he released the single "Yeah Yeah Yeah". In July 2016, he released the single "House Work". Jax says of the track, "At the end of the day, I started making beats on a four-track, so it feels right to put that DIY energy into my music". In December 2016, he released the single "You Don't Know Me" based on the sampling of the bassline of M.A.N.D.Y. vs. Booka Shade's 2005 hit "Body Language". The song became his biggest success, reaching number three in the UK and top five status in several European countries, including Germany, Ireland, Belgium and Norway. Jones continued to release songs wherein he collaborated with the likes of Demi Lovato and Years & Years. He released his debut extended play, Snacks, on 28 November 2018. The EP was later expanded into Jones' first album, Snacks (Supersize), which was released on 6 September 2019.

2020–present: Europa, Deep Joy and other singles
Jax also collaborated with fellow DJ Martin Solveig to create the musical duo Europa. Their first song together, "All Day and Night" (featuring Madison Beer), it was included on Jones' 2018 EP Snacks and was released as single in March 2019. They released their next single, "Tequila" (featuring RAYE), in February 2020. Their third collaboration, "Lonely Heart" features English singer GRACEY, and was released on 2 June 2022.

On 9 October 2020, Jones released the single "I Miss U" alongside Antiguan-German singer Au/Ra. The song peaked at Number 25 on the UK Singles Chart, and a subsequent acoustic version followed. Upon its release, Jones tweeted about the song's message in relation to the COVID-19 pandemic, and an inability to see family and friends due to national lockdowns. He said "i miss u is finally out in the world we all miss something right now and i miss u is supposed to highlight that and remind ourselves that it's ok to feel this way sometimes."

In January 2021, Jones promoted Irish music producer Emmet Glascott & singer Molly Morgans remix of Jones' song '100 Times' on his Instagram story.

On 4 June 2021, Jones released the song "Feels", the lead single off his second EP Deep Joy, which was released on 2 July 2021.

On 13 August 2021, saw the release of "Out Out", a collaborative single with fellow English DJ Joel Corry and featuring the vocals of singer Charli XCX and rapper Saweetie. The song peaked at #6 on the UK Singles Chart.

On 4 February 2022, Jones released the song "Where Did You Go?" featuring MNEK. The track became Jones' 8th UK Top 10 hit and MNEK's 5th, peaking at #7 on the UK Singles Chart for two weeks.

On 18 March 2022, Jones collaborated with Mabel and Galantis on the song "Good Luck".

On 4 June 2022, he participated in the Platinum Party at the Palace, performing with Nandi Bushell and Stefflon Don, as well as Mabel and John Newman to mark the Platinum Jubilee of Elizabeth II.

On 10 March 2023, Jones released "Whistle" featuring vocals from English singer Calum Scott.

Discography

 Snacks (Supersize) (2019)

Awards and Nominations
{| class="wikitable sortable plainrowheaders" 
|-
! scope="col" | Award
! scope="col" | Year
! scope="col" | Nominee(s)
! scope="col" | Category
! scope="col" | Result
! scope="col" class="unsortable"| 
|-
!scope="row" rowspan=4|Brit Awards
| rowspan=2|2015
| rowspan=2|"I Got U" (with Duke Dumont)
| British Video of the Year
| 
| rowspan=2|
|-
| rowspan=2|British Single of the Year
| 
|-
| 2018
| "You Don't Know Me" (with Raye)
| 
| 
|-
| 2019
| rowspan=2|"Breathe" (with Ina Wroldsen)
| British Video of the Year
| 
| 
|-
!scope="row"|Ivor Novello Awards
| 2019
| Most Performed Work
| 
|

References

1987 births
Living people
English house musicians
English multi-instrumentalists
English DJs
English songwriters
English record producers
English people of Turkish descent
English people of Malaysian descent
English people of Chinese descent
Musicians from London
DJs from London
Electronic dance music DJs
Remixers